Rocky Hill Ultralight Flightpark  is a public use ultralight airport located one nautical mile (1.85 km) southeast of the central business district of Cresco, a town in Monroe County, Pennsylvania, United States.

Facilities and aircraft 
It has one runway designated 9/27 with a turf surface measuring 1,000 by 100 feet (305 x 30 m). For the 12-month period ending April 17, 2008, the airport had 150 general aviation aircraft operations.

References

External links 

Airports in Pennsylvania
Ultralight aviation
Transportation buildings and structures in Monroe County, Pennsylvania